Henry Aurélien Charles Allard (1885-1953) was a sailor from France, who represented his country at the 1928 Summer Olympics in Amsterdam, Netherlands.

Sources 
 

Sailors at the 1928 Summer Olympics – 6 Metre
Olympic sailors of France
1885 births
1953 deaths
French male sailors (sport)
20th-century French people